Juan Celaya may refer to:
 Juan Celaya (footballer)
 Juan Celaya (diver)